Mamou (Pular: 𞤍𞤢𞤤𞤭𞥅𞤪𞤫 𞤃𞤢𞥄𞤥𞤵𞤲) is a prefecture located in the Mamou Region of Guinea. The capital is Mamou. The prefecture covers an area of 8,000 km.² and has an estimated population of 222,000.

Sub-prefectures
The prefecture is divided administratively into 14 sub-prefectures:
 Mamou-Centre
 Bouliwel
 Dounet
 Gongoret
 Kégnéko
 Konkouré
 Nyagara
 Ouré-Kaba
 Porédaka
 Saramoussaya
 Soyah
 Téguéréya
 Timbo
 Tolo

Prefectures of Guinea
Mamou Region